Tierra Firme Fútbol Club is a Panamanian football team playing at Liga Nacional de Ascenso. It is based in San Miguelito and it was founded in 1985. Up until 2011, the team played under the name of Paraíso Fútbol Club.

History

Paraíso F.C.

In 2007 Paraíso earned a spot in the Liga Nacional de Ascenso after being crowned champions of the 2007 edition of the Copa Rommel Fernández.
In their three and half seasons in the Liga Nacional de Ascenso, Paraíso had a positive run after reaching the second round of competition in every championship with the exception of the 2008 Clausura edition which they failed to do so due to goal differential. In the second round of competition, Paraíso was defeated in semifinals twice by Orión (2008 (A) and 2009 (A) II) and once by Río Abajo (2009 (A) I), and in the quarterfinals stage once by Atlético Nacional (2010 (A)).

Tierra Firme F.C.
For the Clausura championship of the 2010-11 Liga Nacional de Ascenso season Paraíso changed its name to Tierra Firme Fútbol Club. In that season they failed to qualify to the quarterfinal stage of the championship after finishing 5th in their group (Group A).

Honours
Copa Rommel Fernández: 1
2007

Year-by-year results

Liga Nacional de Ascenso

References

Football clubs in Panama
1985 establishments in Panama
Association football clubs established in 1985